Year0001 (stylized YEAR0001) is an independent record label based in Stockholm, Sweden. Founded in 2015 by Oskar Ekman and Emilio Fagone, it is under an exclusive distribution agreement with Dutch distributor FUGA.

Artist roster
 Bladee
 bod [包家巷]
 Chariot
 Dark0
 Död Mark
 Ecco2K
 Jonatan Leandoer96
 Lokey
 Merely
 Bloodz Boi
 Nadia Tehran
 Provoker
 Quartermaster
 Quiltland
 Snow Strippers
 Team Rockit
 Thaiboy Digital
 DJ Billybool
 Viagra Boys
 Whitearmor
 Gud
 Yung Lean
 Yung Sherman

Discography

References

Swedish record labels